Coryphella californica is a species of sea slug, an aeolid nudibranch, a marine gastropod mollusc in the family Coryphellidae.

Distribution
This species was described from California. It does not seem to have been recognised since the original description.

References

Coryphellidae
Gastropods described in 1904